The Bayer designations c Velorum and C Velorum are distinct. Due to technical limitations, both designations link here. For the star
c Velorum, see HD 78004 (HR 3614)
C Velorum, see HD 73155 (HR 3407)

See also
 γ Velorum (Gamma Velorum)

Vela (constellation)
Velorum, c